Sébastien Romain Teddy Haller (born 22 June 1994) is a professional footballer who plays as a striker for Bundesliga club Borussia Dortmund and the Ivory Coast national team.

Haller began his career in France with Auxerre, and moved on loan to Dutch Eredivisie side Utrecht in 2015, before signing on a permanent basis. Two years later, he moved to the German club Eintracht Frankfurt, winning the DFB-Pokal in 2018. English Premier League side West Ham United signed him a year later for a club-record transfer worth €49.8 million (£45 million).  Haller returned to the Netherlands in 2021, signing with Ajax, for a club record fee of €22.5 million (£18.8 million). In his first six months, he won the Eredivisie and the KNVB Cup. He became the first player to score across seven consecutive UEFA Champions League matches during the 2021–22 season, and then transferred to Borussia Dortmund for an initial €31 million. 

Born in France to a French father and an Ivorian mother, Haller represented France at youth level, before switching his allegiance in 2020 to the Ivory Coast. He scored his first international goal against Madagascar, and represented the national team at the 2021 Africa Cup of Nations.

In 2022 Haller was diagnosed with testicular cancer, which he overcame, returning to professional football in January 2023.

Early life
Haller was born in Ris-Orangis, Essonne, Paris to a French father and an Ivorian mother.

Club career

Auxerre
During the 2011 FIFA U-17 World Cup, on 26 June 2011, Haller signed his first professional contract with Auxerre, agreeing to a three-year deal.

Ahead of the 2012–13 season, Haller was promoted to the senior team by manager Jean-Guy Wallemme. His professional debut came on 27 July 2012, in the team's opening league match of the 2012–13 campaign against Nîmes.

Utrecht
On 24 December 2014, it was announced that Haller was sent on loan to Dutch Eredivisie club Utrecht until the end of the season. At the end of the season, it was announced that FC Utrecht had signed Haller. The supporters voted for Haller as the winner of the Di Tommaso Trophy 2015, Utrecht's player of the year award.

Eintracht Frankfurt
On 15 May 2017, Haller signed with Eintracht Frankfurt on a four-year deal for a reported fee of €7 million. In the 2017–18 DFB-Pokal, he scored four goals for Frankfurt, as the club won the final, marking the first trophy of Haller's career. In the 2018–19 Bundesliga season, he scored 15 league goals in 29 appearances as the club finished seventh.
In addition to his goals scored, he also made nine assists, meaning he was involved in 24 goals, a figure only beaten in the 2018–19 season by Robert Lewandowski with 29.

West Ham United

On 17 July 2019, Haller signed with West Ham United on a five-year deal for a club record fee, that could rise to £45 million. He made his debut on 10 August, playing the full 90 minutes of a 5–0 Premier League loss against reigning champions Manchester City. Two weeks later, he scored his first goals in a 3–1 away win against Watford in which the latter was an acrobatic bicycle kick. Haller struggled at West Ham, attributing it to David Moyes replacing Manuel Pellegrini as manager and then preferring Michail Antonio up front, as well as the ill health of his wife and newborn son.

In July 2020, Frankfurt reported West Ham to FIFA after they had failed to pay an instalment in May 2020 of £5.4 million as part of the £45 million transfer. West Ham claimed that they had withheld the payment, following a contractual dispute between the two clubs. On 16 December, Haller scored an overhead kick in a 1–1 draw against Crystal Palace that was voted as the Premier League Goal of the Month.

Ajax
On 8 January 2021, Haller signed a four-and-a-half-year contract with Dutch club Ajax for a club record fee of €22.5 million (£18.8 million), reuniting with his former Utrecht manager Erik ten Hag. He made his debut two days later as a second-half substitute against De Topper rivals PSV, assisting Antony for the equaliser in a 2–2 draw. On 14 January, he scored his first goal, and provided an assist, in a 3–1 away win over Twente. On 3 February, Haller was mistakenly omitted from the club's list for the knockout stages of the UEFA Europa League and therefore would be unable to play for the club in the competition.

In a 5–1 away victory over Sporting CP in the UEFA Champions League on 15 September 2021, Haller scored twice in each half to become the first player to score four on his Champions League debut since Marco van Basten for A.C. Milan in 1992; the Dutchman had however already played in the competition under its former name of the European Cup. In the following fixture 13 days later, he recorded a goal against Beşiktaş, becoming the first player in the history of the competition to score five goals in his first two matches appearances; against the same team on 24 November, Haller scored twice in a 2–1 win to become the first player to score nine goals in five consecutive matches of the competition. On 7 December, Haller scored in his team's Champions League group stage match, becoming only the second player to register in all six group games after Cristiano Ronaldo in 2017–18 and became the fastest player to 10 goals in competition history. On 23 February 2022, he made amends for an earlier own goal, and helped Ajax to a 2–2 away draw against Benfica in the last, becoming the first player to score in seven consecutive matches in the competition; his side lost 3–2 aggregate. With 21 league goals in 31 games, he finished the season as Eredivisie top scorer.

Borussia Dortmund 
On 6 July 2022, Haller signed a contract with Borussia Dortmund until 30 June 2026. The transfer fee paid was €31 million, which could be increased to as much as €34.5 million after undisclosed bonuses. However, on 18 July, the forward withdrew from the club's pre-season training camp in Switzerland, after he was diagnosed with a malignant testicular tumour. He then underwent two surgeries and four cycles of chemotherapy in order to contrast the spread of the disease.

After successfully completing his treatments, in January 2023 Haller was officially allowed to return to full-time training, as he joined the rest of Dortmund's team at their winter camp in Marbella. On 10 January, he played his first match in almost eight months, featuring in the final minutes of a friendly against Fortuna Düsseldorf. Three days later, he scored a hat-trick within eight minutes in a 6–0 victory in another friendly against Basel. On 22 January, Haller came on as a second half substitute in a 4–3 home win against Augsburg, finally making his competitive debut for Dortmund after a 6-month battle with cancer. On 4 February, he scored his first professional goal for the club in a 5–1 win against Freiburg.

International career

Youth

Haller was a France youth international, having represented his country of birth at every youth level and totalling 51 caps and 27 goals. He played with the under-17 team at the 2011 FIFA U-17 World Cup in Mexico, scoring in a 3–0 win over Argentina in the opening group game.

On 14 November 2013, Haller made his under-21 debut, coming on for Anthony Martial in the 57th minute against Armenia in a European qualifier in Toulouse and scoring to conclude a 6–0 win. He scored a hat-trick on 25 March 2015 in a friendly win of the same score against Estonia, and he did the same on 10 November 2016 in a 5–1 win over the Ivory Coast at the Stade Pierre Brisson.

Senior
In November 2020, Haller was called up to the Ivory Coast national team. He debuted in a 2–1 2021 Africa Cup of Nations qualification win over Madagascar on 12 November, scoring his side's game-winning goal in the 55th minute. He was called up for the finals in Cameroon, where he scored in a 2–2 group stage draw with Sierra Leone; in the last 16 against Egypt, he was substituted at half time in extra time for Maxwel Cornet as the side lost on penalties.

Career statistics

Club

International

Ivory Coast score listed first, score column indicates score after each Haller goal

Honours
Eintracht Frankfurt
DFB-Pokal: 2017–18

Ajax
Eredivisie: 2020–21, 2021–22
KNVB Cup: 2020–21

Individual
David Di Tommaso Trophy: 2015
Bundesliga Rookie of the Month: October 2017
Premier League Goal of the Month: December 2020
Eredivisie top scorer: 2021–22

References

External links

Profile at the Borussia Dortmund website

1994 births
Living people
People from Ris-Orangis
Footballers from Essonne
Ivorian footballers
French footballers
Association football forwards
AJ Auxerre players
FC Utrecht players
Eintracht Frankfurt players
West Ham United F.C. players
AFC Ajax players
Championnat National 2 players
Championnat National 3 players
Ligue 2 players
Eredivisie players
Bundesliga players
Premier League players
France youth international footballers
France under-21 international footballers
Ivory Coast international footballers
2021 Africa Cup of Nations players
French expatriate footballers
Ivorian expatriate footballers
Expatriate footballers in England
Expatriate footballers in Germany
Expatriate footballers in the Netherlands
French expatriate sportspeople in England
French expatriate sportspeople in Germany
French expatriate sportspeople in the Netherlands
Ivorian expatriate sportspeople in England
Ivorian expatriate sportspeople in Germany
Ivorian expatriate sportspeople in the Netherlands
Black French sportspeople
French sportspeople of Ivorian descent
Ivorian people of French descent
Citizens of Ivory Coast through descent